Uchi is a contemporary Japanese sushi restaurant located in Austin, Texas which opened in 2003. The Japanese word "Uchi" translates to "house" in English, and the  space is a refurbished home. Owner and chef  Tyson Cole's menu consists of hot and cool tastings, sushi and sashimi, makimono, yakimono and tempura, and a changing omakase based on seasonal items. In 2011, Cole won the “Best Chef, Southwest” award from the James Beard Foundation.

Sister restaurants

Uchiko
Uchiko, Tyson Cole’s follow up to his first restaurant, Uchi, opened its doors in July 2010. Translated as “child of uchi” from Japanese, Uchiko is located at 4200 North Lamar, just south of 45th Street in Central Austin. Chef Lance Gillum is the current chef de cuisine, Chef Nguyen Nguyen is the current Head Sushi Chef, and Chef Ariana Quant is the current Head Pastry Chef as of Spring of 2022.

Uchiko Denver 
Uchiko Cherry Creek is set to open 2024, at 299 Fillmore St., Denver, CO, 80206.

Uchi Houston
Uchi Houston opened in February 2012, located at 904 Westheimer Rd Houston, TX 77006 Chef Stephen Conklin is the current Chef de Cuisine.

Uchi Dallas
Uchi Dallas opened on June 1, 2015, located at 2817 Maple Ave., Dallas, TX 75201. Alex Astranti is the Chef de Cuisine. Right above Uchi is Uchiba, which is owned by the same people and recently opened in 2018.

Uchi Denver 
Uchi Denver open October 4, 2018, located at 2500 Lawrence St., Denver, CO 80205. Brandon Brumback is the Chef de Cuisine.

Reviews and features
Uchi's success in a city more known for barbecue and brews than stylized fine dining has garnered the restaurant favorable reviews from Fearless Critic.
Articles about chef and owner Tyson Cole have been featured in The Wall Street Journal, Saveur, Oxford American, Tribeza magazine, Austinist, and  Food & Wine Magazine.

Uchiko reviews and features
Opened in July 2010, Uchiko elicited praise and attention from publications across the country. The restaurant has been mentioned in the Houston Chronicle, Nation's Restaurant News, Austin American-Statesman, and Texas Monthly.
In 2011, Uchiko was recognized as one of the top new restaurants in Texas in the Houston Chronicle, The Dallas Morning News, San Antonio Express, and Texas Monthly. The restaurant secured its place on the culinary landscape when - in early 2011 - it was named one of the best new restaurants in America by GQ Magazine.

Biographies
Tyson Cole - Owner and Chef
Owner of Uchi, Uchiko and Uchi Houston, Chef Cole is an American sushi master. Named one of the Top 10 “Best New Chefs” in 2005 by  Food & Wine Magazine, he led a team of Uchi chefs against Chef Masaharu Morimoto on the Food Network program Iron Chef America in March 2008. He has also been named a semifinalist in 2008, 2009, 2010 for the James Beard Foundation Award in the category “Best Chef: Southwest”.

Awards
Notable awards for Uchi include
The Daily Meal - 101 Best Restaurants in America for 2015
Chefs Feed - The Best Dishes in Austin March 2015
Thrillist - The 21 Best Sushi Spots in America January 2015
The Daily Meal - The Best Sushi in America December 2014
TripAdvisor - Travelers' Choice Awards for Fine Dining October 2014
Zagat Guide - Austin's Best Restaurant September 2014
Southern Living - 100 Best Restaurants in the South August 2014 
Nylon Magazine Guide to Austin - Best Restaurant November 2013
Bon Appétit - 20 Most Important Restaurants in America October 2013
Zagat Guide - 10 Austin Restaurant All-Stars September 2013
Bon Appétit - The Best New Sushi Restaurants in America October 2012
Travel and Leisure - Best Seafood Restaurants in America October 2012
 Rare Magazine – Best Fine Dining June 2010
 Rare Magazine – Best Service 2009, 2010
 Rare Magazine – Best Sushi 2008-2010
 Bon Appétit Magazine – Top Ten Sushi Spots April 2009
 The Fearless Critic – Best Restaurant in Austin 2008, 2010
 Zagat Guide – Best Food in Austin 2008-2010
 Houston Chronicle - Top Restaurants in Texas
 Austin Business Journal – Best Chef August 2007
 Austin American-Statesman XLENT – Five-star review May 2007
 Austin Chronicle reader’s poll Favorite Restaurant in Austin 2006-2010
 Austin Chronicle reader’s poll Best Sushi 2004-2010
 Austin Chronicle reader’s poll Best Chef 2005-2010
 Texas Monthly – Best New Restaurants in Texas February 2004

Notable awards for Uchiko include
Houston Chronicle - Top new restaurants in Texas
San Antonio Express - Top new eateries in the state
Dallas Morning News - Top 10 new restaurants in Texas
GQ Magazine- Top new restaurant in America 2010
Texas Monthly - Where to Eat Now, February 2011

See also
 List of sushi restaurants

References

Asian-American culture in Austin, Texas
Japanese-American culture in Texas
Restaurants established in 2003
Restaurants in Texas
Sushi restaurants in the United States
2003 establishments in Texas